The Platinum Brothers are an American record production duo based in Atlanta, Georgia. Consisting of Adam Gibbs and Mike Chesser, the duo produced "Let's Chill" and "So Hot" from Charlie Wilson's album Charlie, Last Name Wilson which has gone on to sell over 300,000 copies.

In 2002, The Platinum Brothers provided the beats to Bone Thugs-N-Harmony's Thug World Order. In August 2004, they sat on the "Super Producers Panel" at Billboard magazine's fifth annual R&B and Hip-Hop Conference Awards in Miami Beach, Florida. In 2005, they contributed to Charlie, Last Name Wilson. They were featured in 2006 on Bone Thugs and Harmony's Koch Records release entitled Thug Stories.

The Platinum Brothers also produced the current single "On The Radio" from Deemi's album entitled Soundtrack Of My Life.  They have also produced for artists such as Bone Thugs and Harmony, Bella, Q. Amey, Will Smith, and 4 songs from Nivea (singer)'s 2005 album entitled 'Complicated.

The Platinum Brothers have been featured on  episode 3 of BET's TV show Keyshia Cole: The Way It Is, TBA (Bone Thugs-n-Harmony album), and The Movement (Mo Thugs album) and currently are featured on the upcoming albums Brave (Jennifer Lopez album) by Jennifer Lopez and Back Of My Lac by J. Holiday.

Film and TV Appearances

2006
Keyshia Cole: The Way It Is -Episode 3 (July 26) -originally aired on BET

Production discography

References

External links
The Platinum Brothers Official website

Musical groups from Atlanta
Record production duos